White Mama is a 1980 American made-for-television drama film directed by Jackie Cooper  and starring Bette Davis in the title role. It was adapted from the novel of the same name by Robert C.S. Downs. It was broadcast as The CBS Wednesday Night Movie on March 5, 1980.

For her performance, Davis was nominated for an Emmy Award for Outstanding Lead Actress in a Miniseries or Movie.

Synopsis
Davis portrays Adele Malone, an impoverished white widow who takes in a black juvenile offender named B.T. for the support money it will bring. During the course of their stormy relationship, Adele teaches B.T. about responsibility, dignity and pride, and he teaches her street savvy, survival and grit. Together they find a mutual trust and respect that are dramatically tested when Adele is evicted from her apartment and forced to join the legions of homeless bag ladies. In the subsequent dramatic change of events, B.T. enters a brutal boxing match where he must fight an awesome opponent in order to help his caring friend to financially survive.

Cast
 Bette Davis as Adele Malone 
 Ernest Harden Jr. as B.T. Williamson
 Eileen Heckart as Three Bag Lady
 Virginia Capers as Gorilla Sydney
 Anne Ramsey as Heavy Charm
 Lurene Tuttle as Mrs. McIntyre
 Tony Burton as Black Fighter
 Peg Shirley as Judge Alice Quentin
 Ernie Hudson as Counselor
 Dan Mason as Father Gannon
 Vincent Schiavelli as Medic

External links
 

1980 television films
1980 films
1980 drama films
Films based on American novels
CBS network films
Films set in New York City
Films shot in New York City
Films about homelessness
Films directed by Jackie Cooper
1980s English-language films